Roman Andreyevich Kartsev  (born Roman Antshelevich Katz; 20 May 1939 – 2 October 2018) was a Russian entertainer of stage, theater and cinema. 

He was Honored Artist of the RSFSR (1990), People's Artist of the Russian Federation (1999). Actor of the Moscow Theater of Miniatures under the leadership of Mikhail Zhvanetsky. For several decades he performed in a duet with Viktor Ilchenko (Kartsev and Ilchenko).

Roman Kartsev was born in Odessa to Sura-Lea (in life as Sonia) Ruvinovna Fuksman and Antshel Zelmanovich Katz. The maternal grandfather, after whom the artist was named, was a synagogue cantor. The spoken language in the family was Yiddish. Before the war, Roman lived with his parents in Tiraspol, where in 1939–1941 his father was a striker for the Tiraspol team in the second league of the USSR Football Championship. During the Great Patriotic War, together with his mother and brother was in evacuation in Omsk; the grandparents who remained in Odessa died. After the demobilization of the father in 1946, the whole family returned to Odessa.

Filmography 
 1967 –  Arkady Raikin (documentary) as cameo
1975 –  Waves of the Black Sea as entrepreneur
1977 – The Magic Voice of Gelsomino as School Teacher
1979 – Dumas in the Caucasus as Lefer
1985 – A Long Memory as Uncle Yasha
1985 – Goldfish (TV performance) as cameo
1988 – Heart of a Dog as Schwonder
1989 – The Evil Spirit as Shcherbaty
1989 – The Bindler and the King as Lazar Boyarsky
 1991 – Promised Heaven as Solomon
 1992 – Apartment (mini-series) as Henry Ivanovich Valenchik
1993 – Prediction as patriot and anti-communist
 2000 – Old Hags as Joseph Lazovsky
 2005 – The Master and Margarita as Maximilian Andreevich Poplavsky, Berlioz's Uncle 
2008 – Smile of God, or Purely Odessa story as Mikhail Perelmuter 
2010 – In the Style of Jazz as Odessa taxi driver

References

External links
 
 

1939 births
2018 deaths
Actors from Odesa
Soviet male film actors
Soviet male stage actors
Russian male film actors
Russian male stage actors
Russian male comedians
Jewish Russian actors
Honored Artists of the RSFSR
People's Artists of Russia
Russian Academy of Theatre Arts alumni
Odesa Jews
Russian humorists
Jewish humorists
Burials in Troyekurovskoye Cemetery